Cem Tuna Türkmen (born 29 March 2002) is a footballer who plays as a midfielder for Austrian club Austria Lustenau on loan from the French club Clermont. Born in Germany, Türkmen is a youth international for Turkey.

Career
Türkmen made his professional debut for Bayer Leverkusen in the UEFA Europa League on 3 December 2020, coming on as a substitute in the 67th minute for Nadiem Amiri against Ligue 1 side Nice. The away match finished as a 3–2 win for Leverkusen.

On 12 July 2021, Türkmen signed with Ligue 1 club Clermont Foot on a free transfer and then immediately loaned to Austrian club Austria Lustenau.

Honours
Austria Lustenau
 Austrian Football Second League: 2021–22

References

External links
 
 
 
 
 

2002 births
Living people
Footballers from Cologne
Turkish footballers
Turkey youth international footballers
German footballers
German people of Turkish descent
Association football midfielders
Bayer 04 Leverkusen players
Clermont Foot players
SC Austria Lustenau players
2. Liga (Austria) players
Austrian Football Bundesliga players
Turkish expatriate footballers
Expatriate footballers in France
Turkish expatriate sportspeople in France
Expatriate footballers in Austria
Turkish expatriate sportspeople in Austria